Madeline Schiller (also Madeleine Schiller) (November 8, 1843  July 3, 1911) was an English-born pianist.

Schiller was born in London.  After early studies in London with Benjamin Isaacs, Julius Benedict, and Charles Hallé, in 1860 she went to Leipzig where she studied with Ignaz Moscheles. She made her debut there on January 23, 1862, playing Mendelssohn's Piano Concerto No. 1. Among her friends at Leipzig was Arthur Sullivan. She returned to London and performed there and throughout the country until her marriage in 1872 to Marcus Elmer Bennett, who was from Boston, Massachusetts. They moved to the U.S. in 1873, where she quickly became well known for her performances with Theodore Thomas and his orchestra in New York.

After her husband's death, she went back to Europe, living for a while in France. She was invited to play again in New York on November 12, 1881, for the world premiere of Tchaikovsky's Piano Concerto No. 2, with the Philharmonic Society of New York under Theodore Thomas.  She remained in New York with her daughter, except for trips to Australia and a brief return to London.  She died, aged 67, in New York City.

Madeline Schiller's impact on U.S. music was significant. She played numerous U.S. premieres of works including concertos by Joachim Raff and Camille Saint-Saëns. She also was active as a teacher. Harvey Worthington Loomis was one of her students.

References

Slonimsky, Nicolas, Baker's Biographical Dictionary of Musicians, 8th ed. 1994.
 Keyton, Michael, "Madeline Schiller", Music and Musicians, May 1987.

1843 births
1911 deaths
English classical pianists
English women pianists
American classical pianists
American women classical pianists
American music educators
American women music educators
Piano pedagogues
Pupils of Ignaz Moscheles
19th-century classical pianists
19th-century English musicians
19th-century American pianists
19th-century American women pianists
British emigrants to the United States
19th-century English women
19th-century American women musicians